Portugues and variants may refer to:
Portugués, Adjuntas, Puerto Rico, a barrio 
Portugués Rural or just Portugués, one of the 31 barrios in the municipality of Ponce, Puerto Rico
Portugués Urbano, one of the 31 barrios in the municipality of Ponce, Puerto Rico
Portugués River in Puerto Rico
Portugués Dam
Português (cigarette)
Bartolomeu Português, Portuguese buccaneer who attacked Spanish shipping in the late 1660s
Deportivo Portugués, Venezuelan football club

See also
Portuguese (disambiguation)